Route 216 is a collector road in the Canadian province of Nova Scotia.

It is located in the Cape Breton Regional Municipality and connects East Bay at Trunk 4 with Christmas Island at Route 223.

It is designated as part of the Bras d'Or Lakes Scenic Drive.

Communities
Christmas Island
Benacadie West
Benacadie Pond
Castle Bay
Eskasoni
Island View
Northside East Bay
McKenzie East Bay
East Bay

See also
List of Nova Scotia provincial highways

References

Roads in the Cape Breton Regional Municipality
Nova Scotia provincial highways